Gangarampur Assembly constituency is an assembly constituency in Dakshin Dinajpur district in the Indian state of West Bengal. It is reserved for scheduled castes.

Overview
As per orders of the Delimitation Commission, No. 41 Gangarampur Assembly constituency (SC) covers Gangarampur municipality, Belbari I, Damdama, Gangarampur and Nandanpur gram panchayats of Gangrampur community development block, and Ajmatpur, Autina, Gurail, Hazratpur, Ramchandrapur and Rampara Chenchra gram panchayats of Tapan community development block.

Gangarampur Assembly constituency (SC) is part of No. 6 Balurghat (Lok Sabha constituency).

Members of Legislative Assembly

Election results

2021
In the 2021 election, Satyendra Nath Ray of BJP defeated his nearest rival, Goutam Das of Trinamool Congress.

,

2016
In the 2016 election, Goutam Das of Congress defeated his nearest rival, Satyendra Nath Ray of Trinamool Congress.

2011
In the 2011 election, Satyendra Nath Ray of Trinamool Congress defeated his nearest rival Nandalal Hazra of CPI(M).

Shukla Bhuimali, contesting as an Indepependent, belonged to CPI(ML).

.# Swing calculated on Congress+Trinamool Congress vote percentages taken together in 2006.

1977–2006
In 2006 and 2001 state assembly elections Narayan Biswas of CPI(M) won the Gangarampur assembly seat defeating his nearest rival Biplab Mitra of Trinamool Congress. Minati Ghosh of CPI(M) defeated Asish Majumdar of BJP in 1996, Biplab Mitra of Congress in 1991 and Ahamed Moslihuddin of Congress in 1987. Ahamed Moslihuddin representing ICS defeated Arabinda Chakrabarty of CPI(M) in 1982. Ahindra Sarkar of CPI(M) defeated Ahamed Moslihuddin of Congress in 1977.

1951–1972
Ahamed Moslihuddin of Congress won in 1972 and 1971. Ahindra Sarkar of CPI(M) won in 1969. K. Sayed of Congress won in 1967. Mangla Kisku of CPI won in 1962. Lakshman Chandra Hansda and Satindra Nath Basu, both of Congress, won in 1957, when Gangarampur was a joint seat. Satindra Nath Basu of Congress won in independent India's first election in 1951.

References

Assembly constituencies of West Bengal
Politics of Dakshin Dinajpur district
Gangarampur